Mao Haoyu (born 17 October 1996) is a Chinese footballer who currently plays for Chinese Super League side Tianjin TEDA.

Club career
Mao Haoyu received a ban of six months by Chinese Football Association for age falsification on 24 August 2016. He was promoted to Chinese Super League side Tianjin TEDA's first team squad in 2018. On 25 April 2018, he made his senior debut and scored his first senior goal in the 2018 Chinese FA Cup against Wuhan Zall which Tianjin TEDA eventually won in the penalty shootout. He made his league debut on 6 May 2018 in a 5–1 away win over Guizhou Hengfeng, coming on as a substitute for Frank Acheampong in the 87th minute.

Career statistics
.

References

External links
 

1996 births
Living people
Chinese footballers
Footballers from Tianjin
Tianjin Jinmen Tiger F.C. players
Chinese Super League players
Association football forwards